Lisan al-Gharbi (Arabic for "Western dialect") is the name given to an extinct dialect of Berber that was spoken over much of the Atlantic plains of Morocco. It was closely related to Tashelhit.

The Lisan al-Gharbi was the official language of the Barghawata Confederacy, and the idiom used in Salih ibn Tarif's "indigenous Qur'an".

The Barghawata's defeat by Almoravids in the 11th century, the settlement of several Arab and Zenata tribes in the area by Almohads and Marinids, the Portuguese invasion in the 15th century, several famines and the resulting displacement of populations made the Masmouda minoritary while Arabic became the dominant language; that led to the Arabization of the remaining Masmouda population and the extinction of the Lisan al-Gharbi.

Nowadays, several tribes and sub-tribes of Masmouda descent are still found among the Doukkala, the Chaouia, the Zaër and the Regraga. However, they are all Arabophone; the only Berber-speaking Masmouda ethnic group to be found in the Atlantic plains is the Hahha confederacy, but no direct filiation link had been established between their dialect (belonging to Tashelhit) and the Lisan al-Gharbi.

References 

Berber languages
Berbers in Morocco
Extinct languages of Africa
Languages of Morocco